Thicker Than Water is an American reality television series that premiered on November 10, 2013, on Bravo. The series chronicles the family dynamic of former professional basketball player and an American gospel-jazz instrumentalist Ben Tankard, his wife Jewel and their children. Bravo previously aired a pilot titled Thicker Than Water: The Marinos in August 2011 that had the same premise but centered on a different family.

In April 2014, Bravo renewed Thicker Than Water for a second season, which premiered on January 4, 2015.

In February 2016, Bravo renewed Thicker Than Water for a third season that premiered on March 27, 2016.

Cast

 Ben Tankard
 Jewel Tankard
 Benji Tankard
 Britney Tankard
 Brooklyn Tankard
 Cyrene Tankard
 Diamond Tankard
 Shanira Tankard

Episodes

Season 1 (2013–14)

Season 2 (2015)

Season 3 (2016)

References

External links

 
 
 

2010s American reality television series
2013 American television series debuts
2016 American television series endings
English-language television shows
Bravo (American TV network) original programming